PPJ may refer to:

Pallo-Pojat Juniorit, an association football club based in Helsinki, Finland
Parti Pirates Jeunes
Putrajaya Corporation
Cycloparc PPJ
Pasir Panjang MRT station (MRT station abbreviation), a Mass Rapid Transit station in Singapore